Verbascum blattaria, the moth mullein, is a flowering biennial plant belonging to the figwort family Scrophulariaceae. A native of Eurasia and North Africa, it has naturalized in the United States and most of Canada since its introduction and has become an invasive species there. It has been declared a noxious weed by the state of Colorado.

Common name
Verbascum blattaria is more commonly referred to as the moth mullein, so named because of the resemblance of its flower's stamens to a moth’s antennae. This is not to be confused with the more popular and widely known common mullein (V. thapsus), a close relative of V. blattaria.

Description

The moth mullein is a biennial plant. In its first year after sowing, its leaves develop as a basal rosette. During this first year, the stem of the plant remains extremely short. The leaves of the rosette are oblanceolate with deeply toothed edges and are attached to the stem by short petioles. The mullein forms a fibrous root system with a deep taproot.
	
This length of stem is commonly referred to as the flowering stem. It usually grows unbranched, and leaves grow alternatively directly off the stem. The leaves located on the flowering stem are similar to the leaves of the rosette; however, they tend to be smaller and elliptical with shallow-toothed edges and have sharply pointed tips. Both the leaves of the rosette and the leaves of the flowering stem are dark green in color and glabrous (hairless).
	
The flowers are produced during the second year of growth on a loose raceme. Each flower is attached individually to the flowering stem by a pedicel. The flowers can be either yellow or white and typically have a slight purple tinge. The stamens of the flower are orange in color and are covered in purple hairs, reminiscent to a moth’s antennae. The flowers of the mullein bloom between June and October of the second year.
	
Each fruit is dark brown in color and contains numerous dark brown seeds. The fruit of the mullein develops, matures, and falls from the plant all in the second year of growth. In certain regions of the world, finches have been known to consume and distribute the seeds.

Distribution
A native of Europe, Asia, and North Africa, Verbascum blattaria has naturalized in most of North America since its introduction. It was first recorded in Pennsylvania in 1818, and was recorded in Michigan in 1840. It has since been found in almost every one of the continental United States, as well as in southern Canada and even Hawaii. In the United States, it is found most abundantly along the East Coast.

Though having a wide range of habitats, Verbascum blattaria is typically found in open fields such as pastures and meadows. It can also be found in open woods. The moth mullein prefers rich soils, but is tolerant of dry, sandy, and even gravelly soils.

Uses
Even in folk medicine, Verbascum blattaria has not been attributed to a wide range of uses. However, a study conducted in 1974 reported that when a number of Aedes aegypti mosquito larvae were exposed to a methanol extract of moth mullein, at least 53% of the larvae were killed. V. blattaria has also long been known to be an effective cockroach repellent, and the name blattaria is actually derived from the Latin word for cockroach, blatta.

Viability
In a famous long-term experiment, Dr. William James Beal, then a professor of botany at Michigan Agriculture College, selected seeds of 21 different plant species (including Verbascum blattaria) and placed seeds of each in 20 separate bottles filled with sand. The bottles, left uncorked, were buried mouth down (so as not to allow moisture to reach the seeds) in a sandy knoll in 1879. The purpose of this experiment was to determine how long the seeds could be buried dormant in the soil, and yet germinate in the future when planted. In 2000, one of these bottles was dug up, and 23 seeds of V. blattaria were planted in favorable conditions, yielding a 50% germination rate.

References

External links

Verbascum : the most complete source
Jepson Manual Treatment
Washington Burke Museum
Photo gallery

blattaria
Plants described in 1753
Taxa named by Carl Linnaeus
Flora of Europe
Flora of North Africa
Flora of temperate Asia